The Pardo River (Portuguese, Rio Pardo) is a river of southeastern Brazil. It originates in the state of Minas Gerais and flows to northwest, crossing the state of São Paulo and draining into Grande River.

See also
 List of rivers of São Paulo
 List of tributaries of the Río de la Plata

References

Brazilian Ministry of Transport

Rivers of São Paulo (state)